Cornbread, Earl and Me is a 1975 American coming-of-age drama film that stars Tierre Turner, Laurence Fishburne (in his film debut), and NBA player Jamaal Wilkes. It was directed and co-produced by Joseph Manduke. The film is loosely based on the 1966 Ronald Fair novel Hog Butcher.

Plot
The film focuses on three African-American youths living in an urban neighborhood. Nathaniel Hamilton is a star basketball player from the neighborhood, nicknamed "Cornbread."  In the film, he epitomizes the dream of the neighborhood to be successful, as he is about to become the first from his district to enter college on an athletic scholarship.

He is also a local hero to the much younger friends Earl Carter and Wilford Robinson. The plot thickens after a pick-up basketball game ends because of a heavy rain, and all the kids run to the local store and hang out, waiting for the rain to end. All the kids leave, except for Cornbread, Earl and Wilford. Earl and Wilford get into a playful argument about how fast Cornbread can run home. It is decided that Cornbread should make it home in 25 seconds, so he runs off, after buying another soda for himself.

Unknown to all of them, an assault suspect in the neighborhood is dressed like Cornbread. The two police officers are hot on the suspect's trail, but lose him in the rain. As the police officers are coming out of an alleyway, they see Cornbread running and mistake him for the suspect they are seeking. Later the two officers fatally shoot Cornbread in the back.

Wilford screams hysterically, ensuing a riot. The coroner's inquest is hampered by severe police intimidation, and no one knows anything about the shooting, except for Wilford, who appears on the witness stand in court by telling exactly what he saw (in graphic detail).

Cast
 Moses Gunn as Benjamin Blackwell, lawyer
 Rosalind Cash as Sarah Robinson, mother of Wilford
 Bernie Casey as Officer Larry Atkins
 Madge Sinclair as Leona Hamilton, mother of Cornbread
 Laurence Fishburne III as Wilford Robinson
 Thalmus Rasulala as Charlie, boyfriend of Sarah
 Antonio Fargas as "One Eye"
 Logan Ramsey as Deputy Coroner
 Vince Martorano as Officer John Golich
 Charles Lampkin as Fred Jenkins, store owner
 Stefan Gierasch as Sergeant Danaher
 Stack Pierce as Sam Hamilton, father of Cornbread
 Tierre Turner as Earl Carter, Wilford's friend
 Jamaal Wilkes (credited as Keith Wilkes) as Nathaniel "Cornbread" Hamilton
 Hal Baylor as Mr. Wilson
 Beverly Hope Atkinson as Edna

Release
Released on May 21, 1975, the film made $83,512 at New York City's Penthouse Theatre in its first week of release. In its third week of release the film made $228,000 from 12 cities. In 1977, the Los Angeles Times stated that it was ultimately a box-office success.

In 2001, the film was released on DVD. In 2010, it was digitized in High Definition (1080i) and broadcast on MGM HD.

See also
 List of American films of 1975
 List of hood films

References

External links
 
 

1975 drama films
1975 films
1970s coming-of-age drama films
African-American drama films
American International Pictures films
American basketball films
Blaxploitation films
Films based on American novels
1970s English-language films
1970s American films